Codex Atlanticus is the fifth studio album by the Austrian symphonic/progressive power metal band Serenity.

All lyrics created based on historical events inspired by Leonardo da Vinci and his legacy except on "Sail".

Track listing

Personnel 
Band members
 Andreas Schipflinger - drums, backing vocals
 Georg Neuhauser - lead and backing vocals
 Fabio D'Amore - 5 & 4-string basses, lead and backing vocals
 Chris Hermsdörfer - electric, acoustic & classical guitars, backing vocals
Guest/session musicians
 Amanda Somerville - female vocals (tracks 1, 9)
 Simon Huber - cello (track 1)
 Natascha Koch - female vocals (track 13), backing vocals (tracks 4, 7)
 Lukas Knoebl - orchestrations and programming, composer (track 1)

Charts

References 

Serenity (band) albums
2016 albums
Napalm Records albums